Seoul Semiconductor develops and commercializes light-emitting diodes (LEDs) for automotive, general illumination, specialty lighting, and backlighting markets. It is the fourth-largest LED manufacturer globally.

References

External links
Seoul Semiconductor
Emcod LED Drivers

Electronics companies established in 1992
Light-emitting diode manufacturers
Electronics companies of South Korea
South Korean brands
Companies listed on KOSDAQ
South Korean companies established in 1992